Georgia was admitted to the Union on January 2, 1788. The state has had senators since the 1st Congress. Its Senate seats were declared vacant in Mar 1861 owing to its secession from the Union. They were again filled from February 1871.

United States senators are popularly elected to six-year terms that begin on January 3 of the year after their election. Elections are held the first Tuesday after November 1. Before 1914, Georgia's senators were chosen by the Georgia General Assembly, and before 1935, their terms began March 4. Popular Senate elections remained despite the General Assembly not taking action to ratify the Seventeenth Amendment to the United States Constitution that was passed in 1913.

Rebecca Latimer Felton was the first female U.S. senator, representing Georgia in the Senate for one day in 1922, having been appointed to the seat to replace the late Thomas E. Watson.

Since January 20, 2021, Georgia has been represented in the Senate by Democrats Jon Ossoff and Raphael Warnock. Ossoff defeated Republican David Perdue in the regularly-scheduled 2020 election, while Warnock defeated appointed Republican incumbent Kelly Loeffler in the concurrent special election, both of which were decided in runoffs on January 5, 2021. Ossoff is the first Jewish senator from Georgia and Warnock the first black senator from Georgia.

List of senators

|- style="height:2em"
! rowspan=2 | 1
| rowspan="2" style="text-align:left;"| William Few
| rowspan=2  | Anti-Admin.
| rowspan=2 nowrap | Mar 4, 1789 –Mar 3, 1793
| rowspan=2 | Elected in 1789.Lost re-election.
| rowspan=2 | 1
| 
| rowspan=3 | 1
| rowspan=3 | Elected in 1789.
| rowspan=8 nowrap | Mar 4, 1789 –Mar 3, 1801
| rowspan=3  | Anti-Admin.
| rowspan="8" style="text-align:right;"| James Gunn
! rowspan=8 | 1

|- style="height:2em"
| 

|- style="height:2em"
! rowspan=2 | 2
| rowspan="2" style="text-align:left;"| James Jackson
|  | Anti-Admin.
| rowspan=2 nowrap | Mar 4, 1793 –Nov 16, 1795
| rowspan=2 | Elected in 1793.Resigned to run for the Georgia legislature.
| rowspan=5 | 2
| 

|- style="height:2em"
|  | Democratic-Republican
| rowspan=3 
| rowspan=5 | 2
| rowspan=5 | Re-elected in 1794.
| rowspan=5  | Federalist

|- style="height:2em"
! 3
| align=left | George Walton
|  | Federalist
| nowrap | Nov 16, 1795 –Feb 20, 1796
| Appointed to continue Jackson's term.Retired when successor elected.

|- style="height:2em"
! rowspan=2 | 4
| rowspan="2" style="text-align:left;"| Josiah Tattnall
| rowspan=2  | Democratic-Republican
| rowspan=2 nowrap | Feb 20, 1796 –Mar 3, 1799
| rowspan=2 | Elected to finish Jackson's term.

|- style="height:2em"
| 

|- style="height:2em"
! rowspan=6 | 5
| rowspan="6" style="text-align:left;"| Abraham Baldwin
| rowspan=6  | Democratic-Republican
| rowspan=6 nowrap | Mar 4, 1799 –Mar 4, 1807
| rowspan=3 | Elected in 1799.
| rowspan=3 | 3
| 

|- style="height:2em"
| 
| rowspan=5 | 3
| rowspan=3 | Elected in 1800.Died.
| rowspan=3 nowrap | Mar 4, 1801 –Mar 19, 1806
| rowspan=3  | Democratic-Republican
| rowspan="3" style="text-align:right;"| James Jackson
! rowspan=3 | 2

|- style="height:2em"
| 

|- style="height:2em"
| rowspan=3 | Re-elected in 1804.Died.
| rowspan=9 | 4
| rowspan=3 

|- style="height:2em"
|  
| nowrap | Mar 19, 1806 –Jun 19, 1806
| colspan=3 | Vacant

|- style="height:2em"
| Elected to finish Jackson's term.
| rowspan=5 nowrap | Jun 19, 1806 –Nov 14, 1809
| rowspan=5  | Democratic-Republican
| rowspan="5" style="text-align:right;"| John Milledge
! rowspan=5 | 3

|- style="height:2em"
| colspan=3 | Vacant
| nowrap | Mar 4, 1807 –Aug 27, 1807
|  
| rowspan=3 
| rowspan=7 | 4
| rowspan=4 | Re-elected in 1806.Resigned.

|- style="height:2em"
! 6
| align=left | George Jones
|  | Democratic-Republican
| nowrap | Aug 27, 1807 –Nov 7, 1807
| Appointed to continue Baldwin's term.Lost special election.

|- style="height:2em"
! rowspan=6 | 7
| rowspan="6" style="text-align:left;"| William H. Crawford
| rowspan=6  | Democratic-Republican
| rowspan=6 nowrap | Nov 7, 1807 –Mar 23, 1813
| rowspan=4 | Elected to finish Baldwin's term.

|- style="height:2em"
| rowspan=3 

|- style="height:2em"
|  
| nowrap | Nov 14, 1809 –Nov 27, 1809
| colspan=3 | Vacant

|- style="height:2em"
| rowspan=2 | Elected to finish Milledge's term.
| rowspan=13 nowrap | Nov 27, 1809 –Mar 3, 1819
| rowspan=13  | Democratic-Republican
| rowspan="13" style="text-align:right;"| Charles Tait
! rowspan=13 | 4

|- style="height:2em"
| rowspan=2 | Re-elected in 1810 or 1811Resigned to become U.S. Minister to France.
| rowspan=8 | 5
| 

|- style="height:2em"
| rowspan=4 
| rowspan=11 | 5
| rowspan=11 | Re-elected in 1813.

|- style="height:2em"
| colspan=3 | Vacant
| nowrap | Mar 23, 1813 –Apr 8, 1813
|  

|- style="height:2em"
! 8
| align=left | William Bellinger Bulloch
|  | Democratic-Republican
| nowrap | Apr 8, 1813 –Nov 6, 1813
| Appointed to continue Crawford's term.Retired when successor elected.

|- style="height:2em"
! rowspan=2 | 9
| rowspan="2" style="text-align:left;"| William Wyatt Bibb
| rowspan=2  | Democratic-Republican
| rowspan=2 nowrap | Nov 6, 1813 –Nov 9, 1816
| rowspan=2 | Elected to finish Crawford's term.Resigned.

|- style="height:2em"
| rowspan=3 

|- style="height:2em"
| colspan=3 | Vacant
| nowrap | Nov 9, 1816 –Nov 13, 1816
|  

|- style="height:2em"
! rowspan=2 | 10
| rowspan="2" style="text-align:left;"| George Troup
| rowspan=2  | Democratic-Republican
| rowspan=2 nowrap | Nov 13, 1816 –Sep 23, 1818
| Elected to finish Bibb's term.

|- style="height:2em"
| Elected to full term in 1816.Resigned.
| rowspan=9 | 6
| rowspan=4 

|- style="height:2em"
| colspan=3 | Vacant
| nowrap | Sep 23, 1818 –Nov 23, 1818
|  

|- style="height:2em"
! 11
| align=left | John Forsyth
|  | Democratic-Republican
| nowrap | Nov 23, 1818 –Feb 17, 1819
| Elected to finish Troup's term.Resigned to become U.S. Minister to Spain.

|- style="height:2em"
| rowspan=2 colspan=3 | Vacant
| rowspan=2 nowrap | Feb 17, 1819 –Nov 6, 1819
| rowspan=2 |  

|- style="height:2em"
| rowspan=2 
| rowspan=8 | 6
| rowspan=8 | Elected in 1819.
| rowspan=8 nowrap | Mar 4, 1819 –Mar 3, 1825
| rowspan=8  | Democratic-Republican
| rowspan="8" style="text-align:right;"| John Elliott
! rowspan=8 | 5

|- style="height:2em"
! rowspan=2 | 12
| rowspan="2" style="text-align:left;"| Freeman Walker
| rowspan=2  | Democratic-Republican
| rowspan=2 nowrap | Nov 6, 1819 –Aug 6, 1821
| rowspan=2 | Elected to finish Forsyth's term.Resigned.

|- style="height:2em"
| rowspan=3 

|- style="height:2em"
| colspan=3 | Vacant
| nowrap | Aug 6, 1821 –Nov 10, 1821
|  

|- style="height:2em"
! rowspan=2 | 13
| rowspan="2" style="text-align:left;"| Nicholas Ware
| rowspan=2  | Democratic-Republican
| rowspan=2 nowrap | Nov 10, 1821 –Sep 7, 1824
| Elected to finish Walker's term.

|- style="height:2em"
| Re-elected in 1823.Died.
| rowspan=6 | 7
| rowspan=3 

|- style="height:2em"
| colspan=3 | Vacant
| nowrap | Sep 7, 1824 –Dec 6, 1824
|  

|- style="height:2em"
! rowspan=3 | 14
| rowspan="3" style="text-align:left;"| Thomas W. Cobb
|  | Democratic-Republican
| rowspan=3 nowrap | Dec 6, 1824 –Nov 7, 1828
| rowspan=3 | Elected to finish Ware's term.Resigned.

|- style="height:2em"
| rowspan=2  | Jacksonian
| 
| rowspan=6 | 7
| rowspan=4 | Elected in 1825.Resigned to become U.S. Attorney General.
| rowspan=4 nowrap | Mar 4, 1825 –Mar 9, 1829
| rowspan=4  | Jacksonian
| rowspan="4" style="text-align:right;"| John M. Berrien
! rowspan=4 | 6

|- style="height:2em"
| rowspan=2 

|- style="height:2em"
! 15
| align=left | Oliver H. Prince
|  | Jacksonian
| nowrap | Nov 7, 1828 –Mar 3, 1829
| Elected to finish Cobb's term.

|- style="height:2em"
! rowspan=5 | 16
| rowspan="5" style="text-align:left;"| George Troup
| rowspan=5  | Jacksonian
| rowspan=5 nowrap | Mar 4, 1829 –Nov 8, 1833
| rowspan=5 | Elected in 1828.Resigned.
| rowspan=9 | 8
| rowspan=3 

|- style="height:2em"
|  
| nowrap | Mar 9, 1829 –Nov 9, 1829
| colspan=3 | Vacant

|- style="height:2em"
| Elected to finish Berrien's term.
| rowspan=5 nowrap | Nov 9, 1829 –Jun 27, 1834
| rowspan=5  | Jacksonian
| rowspan="5" style="text-align:right;"| John Forsyth
! rowspan=5 | 7

|- style="height:2em"
| 
| rowspan=7 | 8
| rowspan=4 | Re-elected in 1830 or 1831.Resigned to become U.S. Secretary of State.

|- style="height:2em"
| rowspan=5 

|- style="height:2em"
| colspan=3 | Vacant
| nowrap | Nov 8, 1833 –Nov 21, 1833
|  

|- style="height:2em"
! rowspan=5 | 17
| rowspan="5" style="text-align:left;"| John P. King
| rowspan=4  | Jacksonian
| rowspan=5 nowrap | Nov 21, 1833 –Nov 1, 1837
| rowspan=3 | Elected to finish Troup's term.

|- style="height:2em"
|  
| nowrap | Jun 27, 1834 –Jan 12, 1835
| colspan=3 | Vacant

|- style="height:2em"
| rowspan=2 | Elected to finish Forsyth's term.
| rowspan=7 nowrap | Jan 12, 1835 –Mar 3, 1843
| rowspan=2  | Jacksonian
| rowspan="7" style="text-align:right;"| Alfred Cuthbert
! rowspan=7 | 8

|- style="height:2em"
| rowspan=2 | Re-elected in 1834.Resigned.
| rowspan=5 | 9
| 

|- style="height:2em"
|  | Democratic
| rowspan=3 
| rowspan=5 | 9
| rowspan=5 | Re-elected in 1837.Retired.
| rowspan=5  | Democratic

|- style="height:2em"
| colspan=3 | Vacant
| nowrap | Nov 1, 1837 –Nov 22, 1837
|  

|- style="height:2em"
! rowspan=2 | 18
| rowspan="2" style="text-align:left;"| Wilson Lumpkin
| rowspan=2  | Democratic
| rowspan=2 nowrap | Nov 22, 1837 –Mar 3, 1841
| rowspan=2 | Elected to finish King's term.

|- style="height:2em"
| 

|- style="height:2em"
! rowspan=9 | 19
| rowspan="3" style="text-align:left;"| John M. Berrien
| rowspan=3  | Whig
| rowspan=3 nowrap | Mar 4, 1841 –May 1845
| rowspan=3 | Elected in 1840.Resigned to become judge of the Supreme Court of Georgia.
| rowspan=5 | 10
| 

|- style="height:2em"
| 
| rowspan=6 | 10
| rowspan=5 | Elected in 1843.Resigned.
| rowspan=5 nowrap | Mar 4, 1843 –Feb 4, 1848
| rowspan=5  | Democratic
| rowspan="5" style="text-align:right;"| Walter T. Colquitt
! rowspan=5 | 9

|- style="height:2em"
| rowspan=3 

|- style="height:2em"
| colspan=2 | Vacant
| nowrap | May 1845 –Nov 13, 1845
|  

|- style="height:2em"
| rowspan="5" style="text-align:left;"| John M. Berrien
| rowspan=5  | Whig
| rowspan=5 nowrap | Nov 13, 1845 –May 28, 1852
| Elected to finish his own term.

|- style="height:2em"
| rowspan=4 | Re-elected in 1846.Resigned.
| rowspan=5 | 11
| rowspan=2 

|- style="height:2em"
| Appointed to finish Colquitt's term.Retired.
| nowrap | Feb 4, 1848 –Mar 3, 1849
|  | Democratic
| align=right | Herschel Johnson
! 10

|- style="height:2em"
| 
| rowspan=5 | 11
| rowspan=5 | Elected in 1847 for the term beginning in 1849.
| rowspan=5 nowrap | Mar 4, 1849 –Mar 3, 1855
| rowspan=5  | Whig
| rowspan="5" style="text-align:right;"| William Crosby Dawson
! rowspan=5 | 11

|- style="height:2em"
| rowspan=3 

|- style="height:2em"
| colspan=3 | Vacant
| nowrap | May 28, 1852 –May 31, 1852
|  

|- style="height:2em"
! 20
| align=left | Robert M. Charlton
|  | Democratic
| nowrap | May 31, 1852 –Mar 3, 1853
| Appointed to finish Berrien's term.
|  

|- style="height:2em"
! rowspan=5 | 21
| rowspan="5" style="text-align:left;"| Robert Toombs
| rowspan=5  | Democratic
| rowspan=5 nowrap | Mar 4, 1853 –Feb 4, 1861
| rowspan=3 | Elected in 1852.
| rowspan=3 | 12
| 

|- style="height:2em"
| 
| rowspan=5 | 12
| rowspan=3 | Elected in 1854 or 1855.Withdrew.
| rowspan=3 nowrap | Mar 4, 1855 –Jan 28, 1861
| rowspan=3  | Democratic
| rowspan="3" style="text-align:right;"| Alfred Iverson Sr.
! rowspan=3 | 12

|- style="height:2em"
| 

|- style="height:2em"
| rowspan=2 | Re-elected in 1858.Withdrew.
| rowspan=5 | 13
| rowspan=3 

|- style="height:2em"
| rowspan=7 | Civil War and Reconstruction
| rowspan=7 nowrap | Jan 28, 1861 –Feb 1, 1871
| rowspan=7 colspan=3 | Vacant

|- style="height:2em"
| rowspan=7 colspan=3 | Vacant
| rowspan=7 nowrap | Feb 4, 1861 –Feb 24, 1871
| rowspan=7 | Civil War and Reconstruction

|- style="height:2em"
| 
| rowspan=3 | 13

|- style="height:2em"
| 

|- style="height:2em"
| rowspan=5 | 14
| 

|- style="height:2em"
| 
| rowspan=6 | 14

|- style="height:2em"
| rowspan=3 

|- style="height:2em"
| rowspan=4 | Elected in 1867 to finish the term, but not seated until Georgia's readmission.Retired.
| rowspan=4 nowrap | Feb 1, 1871 –Mar 3, 1873
| rowspan=4  | Republican
| rowspan="4" style="text-align:right;"| Joshua Hill
! rowspan=4 | 13

|- style="height:2em"
! 22
| align=left | Homer V. M. Miller
|  | Democratic
| nowrap | Feb 24, 1871 –Mar 3, 1871
| Elected to finish term.

|- style="height:2em"
| colspan=3 | Vacant
| nowrap | Mar 4, 1871 –Nov 14, 1871
| Foster Blodgett (R) presented credentials as Senator-elect, but the Senate declared him not elected.
| rowspan=4 | 15
| rowspan=2 

|- style="height:2em"
! rowspan=3 | 23
| rowspan="3" style="text-align:left;"| Thomas M. Norwood
| rowspan=3  | Democratic
| rowspan=3 nowrap | Nov 14, 1871 –Mar 3, 1877
| rowspan=3 | Elected after Blodgett's credentials were rejected.Lost re-election.

|- style="height:2em"
| 
| rowspan=3 | 15
| rowspan=3 | Elected in 1873.
| rowspan=4 nowrap | Mar 4, 1873 –May 26, 1880
| rowspan=4  | Democratic
| rowspan="4" style="text-align:right;"| John B. Gordon
! rowspan=4 | 14

|- style="height:2em"
| 

|- style="height:2em"
! rowspan=4 | 24
| rowspan="4" style="text-align:left;"| Benjamin Harvey Hill
| rowspan=4  | Democratic
| rowspan=4 nowrap | Mar 4, 1877 –Aug 16, 1882
| rowspan=4 | Elected in 1877.Died.
| rowspan=6 | 16
| 

|- style="height:2em"
| rowspan=2 
| rowspan=6 | 16
| Re-elected in 1879.Resigned to promote a venture for the Georgia Pacific Railway.

|- style="height:2em"
| rowspan=5 | Elected to finish Gordon's term.
| rowspan=8 nowrap | May 26, 1880 –Mar 3, 1891
| rowspan=8  | Democratic
| rowspan="8" style="text-align:right;"| Joseph E. Brown
! rowspan=8 | 15

|- style="height:2em"
| rowspan=3 

|- style="height:2em"
| colspan=3 | Vacant
| nowrap | Aug 16, 1882 –Nov 15, 1882
|  

|- style="height:2em"
! 25
| align=left | Middleton P. Barrow
|  | Democratic
| nowrap | Nov 15, 1882 –Mar 3, 1883
| Elected to finish Hill's term.Retired.

|- style="height:2em"
! rowspan=6 | 26
| rowspan="6" style="text-align:left;"| Alfred H. Colquitt
| rowspan=6  | Democratic
| rowspan=6 nowrap | Mar 4, 1883 –Mar 26, 1894
| rowspan=3 | Elected in 1883.
| rowspan=3 | 17
| 

|- style="height:2em"
| 
| rowspan=3 | 17
| rowspan=3 | Re-elected in 1885.Retired due to illness.

|- style="height:2em"
| 

|- style="height:2em"
| rowspan=3 | Re-elected in 1888Died.
| rowspan=5 | 18
| 

|- style="height:2em"
| 
| rowspan=5 | 18
| rowspan=5 | Elected in 1890.Retired.
| rowspan=5 nowrap | Mar 4, 1891 –Mar 3, 1897
| rowspan=5  | Democratic
| rowspan="5" style="text-align:right;"| John B. Gordon
! rowspan=5 | 16

|- style="height:2em"
| rowspan=3 

|- style="height:2em"
| colspan=3 | Vacant
| nowrap | Mar 26, 1894 –Apr 2, 1894
|  

|- style="height:2em"
! 27
| align=left | Patrick Walsh
|  | Democratic
| nowrap | Apr 2, 1894 –Mar 3, 1895
| Appointed to continue Colquitt's term.Elected in 1894 to finish Colquitt's term.Lost renomination.

|- style="height:2em"
! rowspan=13 | 28
| rowspan="13" style="text-align:left;"| Augustus Octavius Bacon
| rowspan=13  | Democratic
| rowspan=13 nowrap | Mar 4, 1895 – Feb 14, 1914
| rowspan=3 | Elected in 1894.
| rowspan=3 | 19
| 

|- style="height:2em"
| 
| rowspan=3 | 19
| rowspan=3 | Elected in 1896.
| rowspan=7 nowrap | Mar 4, 1897 –Nov 13, 1910
| rowspan=7  | Democratic
| rowspan="7" style="text-align:right;"| Alexander S. Clay
! rowspan=7 | 17

|- style="height:2em"
| 

|- style="height:2em"
| rowspan=3 | Re-elected in 1900.Legislature failed to elect.
| rowspan=3 | 20
| 

|- style="height:2em"
| 
| rowspan=3 | 20
| rowspan=3 | Re-elected in 1902.
|- style="height:2em"
| 

|- style="height:2em"
| rowspan=6 | Appointed to begin the next term.Re-elected in 1907.Legislature failed to elect.
| rowspan=6 | 21
| 

|- style="height:2em"
| rowspan=3 
| rowspan=9 | 21
| Re-elected in 1909.Died.

|- style="height:2em"
|  
| nowrap | Nov 13, 1910 –Nov 17, 1910
| colspan=3 | Vacant

|- style="height:2em"
| rowspan=2 | Appointed to continue Clay's term.Lost election to finish Clay's term.
| rowspan=2 nowrap | Nov 17, 1910 –Jul 14, 1911
| rowspan=2  | Democratic
| rowspan="2" style="text-align:right;"| Joseph M. Terrell
! rowspan=2 | 18

|- style="height:2em"
| rowspan=2 

|- style="height:2em"
| rowspan=5 | Elected to finish Clay's term.Did not take office until Nov 16 upon resigning as Governor of Georgia.
| rowspan=8 nowrap | Jul 14, 1911 –Mar 3, 1921
| rowspan=8  | Democratic
| rowspan="8" style="text-align:right;"| M. Hoke Smith
! rowspan=8 | 19

|- style="height:2em"
| Appointed to begin the term.Re-elected in 1913, the first election by popular vote.Died.
| rowspan=6 | 22
| rowspan=4 

|- style="height:2em"
| colspan=3 | Vacant
| nowrap | Feb 14, 1914 –Mar 2, 1914
|  

|- style="height:2em"
! 29
| align=left | William S. West
|  | Democratic
| nowrap | Mar 2, 1914 –Nov 3, 1914
| Appointed to continue Bacon's term.Successor elected.

|- style="height:2em"
! rowspan=3 | 30
| rowspan="3" style="text-align:left;"| Thomas W. Hardwick
| rowspan=3  | Democratic
| rowspan=3 nowrap | Nov 4, 1914 –Mar 3, 1919
| rowspan=3 | Elected to finish Bacon's term.Lost renomination.

|- style="height:2em"
| 
| rowspan=3 | 22
| rowspan=3 | Re-elected in 1914.Lost renomination.

|- style="height:2em"
| 

|- style="height:2em"
! rowspan=10 | 31
| rowspan="10" style="text-align:left;"| William J. Harris
| rowspan=10  | Democratic
| rowspan=10 nowrap | Mar 4, 1919 –Apr 18, 1932
| rowspan=6 | Elected in 1918.
| rowspan=6 | 23
| 

|- style="height:2em"
| rowspan=4 
| rowspan=6 | 23
| Elected in 1920.Died.
| nowrap | Mar 4, 1921 –Sep 26, 1922
|  | Democratic
| align=right | Thomas E. Watson
! 20

|- style="height:2em"
|  
| nowrap | Sep 26, 1922 –Nov 21, 1922
| colspan=3 | Vacant

|- style="height:2em"
| Appointed to continue Watson's term.Retired.
| nowrap | Nov 21, 1922 –Nov 22, 1922
|  | Democratic
| align=right | Rebecca Latimer Felton
! 21

|- style="height:2em"
| rowspan=3 | Elected to finish Watson's term.
| rowspan=21 nowrap | Nov 22, 1922 –Jan 3, 1957
| rowspan=21  | Democratic
| rowspan="21" style="text-align:right;"| Walter F. George
! rowspan=21 | 22

|- style="height:2em"
| 

|- style="height:2em"
| rowspan=3 | Re-elected in 1924.
| rowspan=3 | 24
| 

|- style="height:2em"
| 
| rowspan=6 | 24
| rowspan=6 | Re-elected in 1926.

|- style="height:2em"
| 

|- style="height:2em"
| Re-elected in 1930.Died.
| rowspan=6 | 25
| rowspan=4 

|- style="height:2em"
| colspan=3 | Vacant
| nowrap | Apr 18, 1932 –Apr 25, 1932
|  

|- style="height:2em"
! 32
| align=left | John S. Cohen
|  | Democratic
| nowrap | Apr 25, 1932 –Jan 11, 1933
| Appointed to continue Harris's term.Successor elected.

|- style="height:2em"
! rowspan=21 | 33
| rowspan="21" style="text-align:left;"| Richard Russell Jr.
| rowspan=21  | Democratic
| rowspan=21 nowrap | Jan 12, 1933 –Jan 21, 1971
| rowspan=3 | Elected in 1932 to finish Harris's term.

|- style="height:2em"
| 
| rowspan=3 | 25
| rowspan=3 | Re-elected in 1932.

|- style="height:2em"
| 

|- style="height:2em"
| rowspan=3 | Re-elected in 1936.
| rowspan=3 | 26
| 

|- style="height:2em"
| 
| rowspan=3 | 26
| rowspan=3 | Re-elected in 1938.

|- style="height:2em"
| 

|- style="height:2em"
| rowspan=3 | Re-elected in 1942.
| rowspan=3 | 27
| 

|- style="height:2em"
| 
| rowspan=3 | 27
| rowspan=3 | Re-elected in 1944.

|- style="height:2em"
| 

|- style="height:2em"
| rowspan=3 | Re-elected in 1948.
| rowspan=3 | 28
| 

|- style="height:2em"
| 
| rowspan=3 | 28
| rowspan=3 | Re-elected in 1950.Retired.

|- style="height:2em"
| 

|- style="height:2em"
| rowspan=3 | Re-elected in 1954.
| rowspan=3 | 29
| 

|- style="height:2em"
| 
| rowspan=3 | 29
| rowspan=3 | Elected in 1956.
| rowspan=15 nowrap | Jan 3, 1957 – Jan 3, 1981
| rowspan=15  | Democratic
| rowspan="15" style="text-align:right;"| Herman Talmadge
! rowspan=15 | 23

|- style="height:2em"
| 

|- style="height:2em"
| rowspan=3 | Re-elected in 1960.
| rowspan=3 | 30
| 

|- style="height:2em"
| 
| rowspan=3 | 30
| rowspan=3 | Re-elected in 1962.

|- style="height:2em"
| 

|- style="height:2em"
| rowspan=3 | Re-elected in 1966.Died.
| rowspan=6 | 31
| 

|- style="height:2em"
| 
| rowspan=6 | 31
| rowspan=6 | Re-elected in 1968.

|- style="height:2em"
| rowspan=4 

|- style="height:2em"
| colspan=3 | Vacant
| nowrap | Jan 21, 1971 –Feb 1, 1971
|  

|- style="height:2em"
! 34
| align=left | David H. Gambrell
|  | Democratic
| nowrap | Feb 1, 1971 –Nov 7, 1972
| Appointed to continue Russell's term.Lost nomination to finish Russell's term.

|- style="height:2em"
! rowspan=13 | 35
| rowspan="13" style="text-align:left;"| Sam Nunn
| rowspan=13  | Democratic
| rowspan=13 nowrap | Nov 8, 1972 –Jan 3, 1997
| Elected to finish Russell's term.

|- style="height:2em"
| rowspan=3 | Elected to full term in 1972.
| rowspan=3 | 32
| 

|- style="height:2em"
| 
| rowspan=3 | 32
| rowspan=3 | Re-elected in 1974.Lost re-election.

|- style="height:2em"
| 

|- style="height:2em"
| rowspan=3 | Re-elected in 1978.
| rowspan=3 | 33
| 

|- style="height:2em"
| 
| rowspan=3 | 33
| rowspan=3 | Elected in 1980.Lost re-election.
| rowspan=3 nowrap | Jan 3, 1981 –Jan 3, 1987
| rowspan=3  | Republican
| rowspan="3" style="text-align:right;"| Mack Mattingly
! rowspan=3 | 24

|- style="height:2em"
| 

|- style="height:2em"
| rowspan=3 | Re-elected in 1984.
| rowspan=3 | 34
| 

|- style="height:2em"
| 
| rowspan=3 | 34
| rowspan=3 | Elected in 1986.Lost re-election.
| rowspan=3 nowrap | Jan 3, 1987 –Jan 3, 1993
| rowspan=3  | Democratic
| rowspan="3" style="text-align:right;"| Wyche Fowler
! rowspan=3 | 25

|- style="height:2em"
| 

|- style="height:2em"
| rowspan=3 | Re-elected in 1990.Retired.
| rowspan=3 | 35
| 

|- style="height:2em"
| 
| rowspan=3 | 35
| rowspan=3 | Elected in 1992 in runoff election.
| rowspan=4 nowrap | Jan 3, 1993 –Jul 18, 2000
| rowspan=4  | Republican
| rowspan="4" style="text-align:right;"| Paul Coverdell
! rowspan=4 | 26

|- style="height:2em"
| 

|- style="height:2em"
! rowspan=5 | 36
| rowspan="5" style="text-align:left;"| Max Cleland
| rowspan=5  | Democratic
| rowspan=5 nowrap | Jan 3, 1997 –Jan 3, 2003
| rowspan=5 | Elected in 1996.Lost re-election.
| rowspan=5 | 36
| 

|- style="height:2em"
| rowspan=3 
| rowspan=5 | 36
| Re-elected in 1998.Died.

|- style="height:2em"
|  
| nowrap | July 18, 2000 –July 27, 2000
| colspan=3 | Vacant

|- style="height:2em"
| rowspan=3 | Appointed to continue Coverdell's term.Elected in 2000 to finish Coverdell's term.Retired.
| rowspan=3 nowrap | July 27, 2000 –Jan 3, 2005
| rowspan=3  | Democratic
| rowspan="3" style="text-align:right;"| Zell Miller
! rowspan=3 | 27

|- style="height:2em"
| 

|- style="height:2em"
! rowspan=6 | 37
| rowspan="6" style="text-align:left;"| Saxby Chambliss
| rowspan=6  | Republican
| rowspan=6 nowrap | Jan 3, 2003 –Jan 3, 2015
| rowspan=3 | Elected in 2002.
| rowspan=3 | 37
| 

|- style="height:2em"
| 
| rowspan=3 | 37
| rowspan=3 | Elected in 2004.
| rowspan=8 nowrap | Jan 3, 2005 –Dec 31, 2019
| rowspan=8  | Republican
| rowspan="8" style="text-align:right;"| Johnny Isakson
! rowspan=8 | 28

|- style="height:2em"
| 

|- style="height:2em"
| rowspan=3 | Re-elected in 2008 in runoff election.Retired.
| rowspan=3 | 38
| 

|- style="height:2em"
| 
| rowspan=3 | 38
| rowspan=3 | Re-elected in 2010.

|- style="height:2em"
| 

|- style="height:2em"
! rowspan=5 | 38
| rowspan="5" style="text-align:left;"| David Perdue
| rowspan=5  | Republican
| rowspan=5 nowrap | Jan 3, 2015 –Jan 3, 2021
| rowspan=5 | Elected in 2014.Term expired before runoff election.Lost re-election in runoff.
| rowspan=5 | 39
| 

|- style="height:2em"
| 
| rowspan=6 | 39
| rowspan=2 | Re-elected in 2016.Resigned.

|- style="height:2em"
| 

|- style="height:2em"
|  
| nowrap | Dec 31, 2019 –Jan 6, 2020
| colspan=3 | Vacant

|- style="height:2em"
| rowspan=2 | Appointed to continue Isakson's term.Lost election in runoff to finish Isakson's term.
| rowspan=2 nowrap | Jan 6, 2020 –Jan 20, 2021
| rowspan=2  | Republican
| rowspan="2" style="text-align:right;"| Kelly Loeffler
! rowspan=2 | 29

|- style="height:2em"
| colspan=3 | Vacant
| nowrap | Jan 3, 2021 –Jan 20, 2021
| 
| rowspan=4 | 40
| 

|- style="height:2em"
! rowspan=3 | 39
| rowspan="3" style="text-align:left;"| Jon Ossoff
| rowspan=3  | Democratic
| rowspan=3 nowrap | Jan 20, 2021 –Present
| rowspan=3 | Elected in 2021 in runoff election.
| Elected in 2021 in runoff election to finish Isakson's term.
| rowspan=4 nowrap | Jan 20, 2021 –Present
| rowspan=4  | Democratic
| rowspan="4" style="text-align:right;"| Raphael Warnock
! rowspan=4 | 30

|- style="height:2em"
| 
| rowspan=3 | 40
| rowspan=3 | Re-elected in 2022 in runoff election.

|- style="height:2em"
| 

|- style="height:2em"
| rowspan=2 colspan=5 | To be determined in the 2026 election.
| rowspan=2| 41
| 

|- style="height:2em"
| 
| 41
| colspan=6 | To be determined in the 2028 election.

See also

 List of United States representatives from Georgia
 United States congressional delegations from Georgia
 Elections in Georgia (U.S. state)

Notes

References 

 

 
Georgia
United States Senators